Big Five Software ( Big 5 Software) was an American video game developer in the first half of the 1980s founded by Bill Hogue and Jeff Konyu. The company released games for the Tandy TRS-80 and later the Atari 8-bit family. Most of its TRS-80 games were clones of arcade games of the time, such as Galaxy Invasion (Galaxian), Super Nova (Asteroids), Defense Command (Missile Command), and Meteor Mission (Lunar Rescue). Big Five also sold an Atari joystick interface called TRISSTICK which was popular with TRS-80 owners. The company's most successful release was original: the 10-stage platform game Miner 2049er, released for the Atari 8-bit family in 1982 and widely ported to other systems.

Hogue stopped developing games after Big Five's final release, Bounty Bob Strikes Back (1984-85). In 2007, he released a free, custom emulation of the Atari 8-bit versions of Miner 2049'er and Bounty Bob Strikes Back for Microsoft Windows.

Games

TRS-80 
 Attack Force (1980)
 Cosmic Fighter (1980)
 Galaxy Invasion (1980)
 Meteor Mission (1980)
 Meteor Mission II (1980)
 Galaxy Invasion Plus (1980)
 Super Nova (1980)
 Robot Attack (1981)
 Stellar Escort (1981)
 Defense Command (1982)
 Weerd (1982)

Atari 8-bit
 Miner 2049er (1982)
 Bounty Bob Strikes Back! (1984)

References

TRS-80
Defunct video game companies of the United States